Opera Cup (2020) was a professional wrestling tournament produced by Major League Wrestling (MLW), which took place at the GILT Nightclub in Orlando, Florida. It was the second edition of the MLW Opera Cup. The event was featured in episodes of Fusion that aired between November 25 and December 23, 2020 on Fubo Sports Network and MLW's YouTube channel.

Production

Background
Opera House Cup was annually held as a professional wrestling tournament for nearly fifty years in various cities in the United States until 1948, when Stu Hart won the tournament and it was discontinued. Hart kept the possession of the Opera Cup trophy since then. On July 21, 2019, Major League Wrestling announced that it would be holding an event on December 5 at the Melrose Ballroom in Queens, New York City, New York which would be a set of television tapings of MLW's television program Fusion. On July 24, it was reported that Stu Hart's grandson and MLW wrestler Teddy Hart would be donating an inherited "family heirloom" to MLW. On July 30, MLW.com announced that the family heirloom was Stu Hart's Opera Cup trophy and MLW would be bringing back the Opera Cup tournament on the December 5 supercard, naming it Opera Cup.

On December 19, 2019, it was announced on MLW's website that the tournament would be resumed in 2020. On November 19, 2020, it was announced that the 2020 edition of Opera Cup tournament would begin on the November 25 episode of Fusion and all the eight participants of the tournament were announced, with Gino Medina, Dominic Garrini, Jordan Oliver, El Hijo de L.A. Park, King Mo Lawal, and Lucha Libre AAA Worldwide wrestler Daga named as the alternate participants in the Opera Cup.

Storylines
The card consisted of matches that resulted from scripted storylines, where wrestlers portrayed villains, heroes, or less distinguishable characters in scripted events that built tension and culminated in a wrestling match or series of matches, with results predetermined by MLW's writers. Storylines were played out on MLW's television program Fusion.

Quarter-finals
On November 19, the brackets of the Opera Cup tournament were revealed by MLW and the participants from the MLW roster were A. C. H., Low Ki, Richard Holliday, TJP, Tom Lawlor and previous year's tournament winner Davey Boy Smith Jr. Guest entrants included Lucha Libre AAA Worldwide representative Laredo Kid and New Japan Pro-Wrestling representative Rocky Romero. The first two matches of the opening round were scheduled to take on the November 25 episode of Fusion pitting Lawlor against Romero and TJP against Holliday. The second two matches of the opening round were set to take place on the December 2 episode of Fusion, with the first match pitting Kid against ACH and the second match pitting Ki against Smith, a rematch from the previous year's Opera Cup.

Semi-final
ACH, Low Ki, Richard Holliday and Tom Lawlor won their respective tournament matches and advanced to the semi-final round. The first semi-final match was set up between Ki and Holliday to take place on the December 9 episode of Fusion and the second semi-final between Lawlor and ACH was set to take place on the December 16 episode of Fusion.

Final
Low Ki and Tom Lawlor won their respective matches in the semi-final round, thus setting up the tournament final of the Opera Cup between Ki and Lawlor on the December 23 episode of Fusion, won by Lawlor.

Results

Tournament brackets
The brackets of the Opera Cup were revealed by MLW on November 19, 2020.

References

External links
Major League Wrestling official website

MLW Opera Cup
2020 in professional wrestling
Professional wrestling in Orlando, Florida
November 2020 events in the United States